The Nogoya River (Spanish, Arroyo Nogoyá, variant name Río Nogoyá) is a river of Argentina. It is a tributary of the Paraná River, which it joins in a region of wetlands and complex distributaries.

See also
List of rivers of Argentina

References

 Rand McNally, The New International Atlas, 1993.

Rivers of Argentina
Tributaries of the Paraná River
Rivers of Entre Ríos Province